Penalty Phase is a 1986 American made-for-television thriller drama film directed  by Tony Richardson and starring Peter Strauss.

Plot

Supreme court judge, Kenneth Hoffman (Peter Strauss) oversees a high-profile murder trial which appears to be an open-and-shut case. The murderer has confessed and Prosecutor Susan Jansen (Jonelle Allen) is direct and hard hitting, and the jury has delivered a guilty verdict. However, Judge Hoffman discovers that the evidence was not legally obtained, and for him to reject it and the trial outcome may have consequences for his career.

Cast 
 Peter Strauss as  Judge Kenneth Hoffman
 Jonelle Allen as Susan Jansen
 Karen Austin as Julie
 Melissa Gilbert as Leah Furman 
 Mitchell Ryan as Judge Donald Faulkner  
 Jane Badler as Katie Pinter
 John Harkins as Mr. Hunter
 Millie Perkins as Nancy Faulkner
 Richard Bright as Judge Von Karman
 Richard Chaves as Nolan Esherman
 Rossie Harris as Zach Hoffman
 Art LaFleur as Pete Pavlovich

References

External links 

1986 television films
1986 films
1980s thriller drama films
American thriller drama films
CBS network films
Films directed by Tony Richardson
New World Pictures films
1986 thriller films
American thriller television films
American drama television films
1980s American films